In enzymology, a globoside alpha-N-acetylgalactosaminyltransferase is an enzyme that catalyzes the chemical reaction

UDP-N-acetyl-D-galactosamine + N-acetyl-D-galactosaminyl-1,3-D-galactosyl-1,4-D-galactosyl-1,4-D- glucosylceramide  UDP + N-acetyl-D-galactosaminyl-N-acetyl-D-galactosaminyl-1,3-D- galactosyl-1,4-D-galactosyl-1,4-D-glucosylceramide

The 3 substrates of this enzyme are UDP-N-acetyl-D-galactosamine, N-acetyl-D-galactosaminyl-1,3-D-galactosyl-1,4-D-galactosyl-1,4-D-, and glucosylceramide, whereas its 3 products are UDP, N-acetyl-D-galactosaminyl-N-acetyl-D-galactosaminyl-1,3-D-, and galactosyl-1,4-D-galactosyl-1,4-D-glucosylceramide.

This enzyme belongs to the family of glycosyltransferases, specifically the hexosyltransferases.  The systematic name of this enzyme class is UDP-N-acetyl-D-galactosamine:N-acetyl-D-galactosaminyl-1,3-D-galacto syl-1,4-D-galactosyl-1,4-D-glucosylceramide alpha-N-acetyl-D-galactosaminyltransferase. Other names in common use include uridine diphosphoacetylgalactosamine-globoside, alpha-acetylgalactosaminyltransferase, Forssman synthase, and globoside acetylgalactosaminyltransferase.  This enzyme participates in glycosphingolipid biosynthesis - globoseries and glycan structures - biosynthesis 2.

References

 

EC 2.4.1
Enzymes of unknown structure